Sev was a rock band from the Northern Virginia area who appeared in a national advertising campaign for Pepsi Blue. Sev also appeared on the website come-alive show Farmclub and performed at HFStival, the summer festival in the Washington D.C. area that typically sets off the summer concert season. In the two decades since then, the band has toured North America and shared the stage with dozens of other local bands and platinum–selling artists of the era, including Dr. Dre, Snoop Dogg, Ice Cube, 311, Red Hot Chili Peppers, Incubus, Kid Rock, Avril Lavigne, and Korn. They endured member changes, secured deals with two major record labels, and performed on national TV shows and television commercials. In 2006, the band parted ways and scattered across the country.

Biography

Early Years
The D.C. area band SEV played their first show on October, 27th 1996. SEV's catalyst, guitarist Max Alley, wrote the music for the band's first album Sunflower with bassist Will Mazur and drummer Dennis Fay. The trio quickly identified vocalists Danny Schools and Phil Clayman from other local projects and were soon selling out shows at local venues. The combination of metal, rap, pop, and electronic music, mixed with their signature high-energy shows, made every performance a unique experience. SEV gained the attention of the Mid-Atlantic music scene by winning the “Big Break” contest hosted by at-the-time alternative rock radio station 99.1 WHFS. They opened the 1999 HFStival with a performance on the Street Stage.

Rise
Their rising success garnered the attention of several national record labels, and the band originally signed with the Interscope/Universal joint venture Farmclub in 2000 with record industry moguls Jimmy Iovine and Doug Morris. On the show, Sev performed the songs "Stand Straight" and "Same Old Song". "Stand Straight" became Sev's first national single on Farmclub compilations, but not as an official single from the band. Sev immediately went into the studio in 2000 to capitalize on their sudden success. However, the label closed its doors in 2001 and the band subsequently signed with Geffen and released their debut album, All These Dreams, in 2002. Geffen, not having an interest in the band, took two years to release All These Dreams. Once the album finally came out in 2002, Geffen announced it had no other plans for the band and stopped all communication. Despite that, the success of their first single, "Same Old Song", caught the attention of Pepsi and the band filmed a commercial for the launch of Pepsi Blue. "Same Old Song" would eventually chart, peaking at No. 25 on the Billboard Hot Singles Sales chart. A few songs from All These Dreams appeared on the extreme stunt DVD series by Adrenaline Crew. 

Soon after, the band's original drummer was replaced in 2003 by Matt Hughes. The original bassist was replaced by Chris Mullen, then Tim Pryor, and then Matt Waller. Throughout all of the ups and downs, one thing has remained consistent: the band's intense drive to deliver high-energy shows to their fans.

Final years
A follow-up album was in the works but never came to be. Some of the songs from this era can be downloaded for free at the band's website. The band experienced several lineup changes and then eventually became inactive in 2006.

Reunion
Their former manager and event producer, Eddie Fam of IMPACT Collective, has brought together four of the five original band members for a reunion concert as a way to raise funds for at-risk youth in DC, Virginia, Haiti, and Africa. April 27th, 2019 will be the band's first show together in 12 years and this performance will help provide medical access, education, food provision, and music programs through Meant 2 Live Foundation.

Members

Original members
Max Alley – Guitars
Danny Schools – Vocals, Guitars
Phil Clayman – Vocals  
Will Mazur – Bass
Dennis Fay – Drums

Later members
Matt Hughes – Drums
Jeremiah Fowler - 2nd Guitar
Matt Waller – Bass
Chris Mullen – Bass
Bill Ledbetter – Drums
Tim Pryor – Bass
Ryan Rainbro - Bass

Discography

Albums

All These Dreams CD / LP (Geffen, 2002)

 All These Dreams
 Same Old Song
 Menace To Society
 When
 All Right By Me
 Stand Straight
 24/7/365
 Front Of The Line
 What You Got For Me
 Lust
 Player
 Twisted

Back Rider CD / LP (1998)

 Techno
 24-7
 Higher
 Advance
 Who's Got The Mic?
 Crashing
 Jump (Remix)
 Gotta (Remix)
 Buy It (Remix)
 Bonus Track (#68)
 Bonus Track (#69)

Sunflower CD / LP (1996)

 Drop
 Stand
 Gotta
 When
 Jump
 Drinking
 Buy It
 Hip Hop Habeeb (bonus track)

Singles
 Same Old Song (2002)

References

External links
SevOfficial Site
Official Myspace - Sev

Musical groups established in 1995
Musical groups from Virginia
Alternative rock groups from Virginia
Turkish-language songs